Walter Lapini (born 3 April 1974 in Italy) is an Italian retired footballer.

Career

On the 16th of December 1993, in a 1-0 Coppa Italia win against Sampdoria, Lapini came on as a substitute for future A.S. Roma legend Francesco Totti, who was making his first start.

At the age of 26, he retired due to injury.

References

External links
 Walter Lapini at Calcio-seriea.net

Italian footballers
Living people
Association football forwards
1974 births
A.C. ChievoVerona players
A.S.G. Nocerina players
S.S. Chieti Calcio players
U.S. Città di Pontedera players
A.C.N. Siena 1904 players